Karachi United Stadium is a football stadium in the DHA neighborhood of Karachi. It is the home ground of Pakistani football club Karachi United.

Events
It is the home venue of the Karachi United team as well as a venue for high school soccer tournaments.

See also
 List of stadiums by capacity
 List of stadiums in Pakistan
 List of cricket grounds in Pakistan
 List of sports venues in Karachi
 List of sports venues in Lahore
 List of sports venues in Faisalabad

References

Defence, Karachi
Football venues in Pakistan
Stadiums in Karachi